The University of Zimbabwe Farm is a farm in Teviotdale, Mazowe District, north of Harare. It is operated by the University of Zimbabwe Faculty of Agriculture for teaching and research, including for field trials in crop science  and animal science.

References

Mazowe District
University of Zimbabwe
Farms in Zimbabwe
Buildings and structures in Mashonaland Central Province